Goulais Bay 15C was a First Nation reserve within Prince Township, Ontario. This 5-acre tract of land was given to the Batchewana First Nation of Ojibways after Whitefish Island was expropriated from them in 1902. The land was sold by the band in 1956 for $3,600, and it ceased to be a reserve.

References

Communities in Algoma District
Ojibwe reserves in Ontario